Canary Island is a locality in north central Victoria, Australia. The locality is an inland island formed by Twelve Mile Creek - an anabranch of the Loddon River.

References

External links

Towns in Victoria (Australia)
Shire of Loddon